West Pendam is one of the 32 assembly constituencies of Sikkim, a north east state of India. This constituency falls under Sikkim Lok Sabha constituency and lies in Pakyong district.

Members of Legislative Assembly

Election results

2019

See also
 Sikkim Lok Sabha constituency
 Gangtok
 Pakyong district

References

Assembly constituencies of Sikkim
Gangtok
Pakyong district